Patrick Daniel McCarney (born July 28, 1953) is a former American football coach. He served as the head football coach at Iowa State University from 1995 to 2006 and the University of North Texas from 2011 to 2015, compiling a career college football coaching record of 78–117.

Playing career
McCarney played football at Iowa City High School, and was an offensive lineman at the University of Iowa from 1972 to 1974 and was named team captain in 1974.

Coaching career

Iowa
McCarney returned to Iowa as a graduate assistant from 1977 to 1978 under Bob Commings. When Hayden Fry arrived at Iowa in 1979, he named McCarney as defensive line coach, a post he held for 10 years—during which Iowa made two appearances in the Rose Bowl.

Wisconsin
McCarney served as the defensive coordinator and defensive line coach at the University of Wisconsin–Madison under Barry Alvarez from 1990 to 1994.

Iowa State
McCarney served as head coach at Iowa State University from 1995 to 2006. During that span, McCarney led the Cyclones to five bowl games, tied with Matt Campbell for the most in Iowa State history. The Cyclones had been to only three bowl games in their entire history before his arrival. In their first bowl appearance under McCarney, the 2000 Insight.com Bowl, the Cyclones notched their first bowl win in school history. His 56 wins and 85 losses are both school records.

At the time of his resignation in November 2006, he was the longest tenured head football coach in the Big 12 Conference.

South Florida
In February 2007, McCarney accepted a position as the defensive line coach and assistant head coach at the University of South Florida.

Florida
The next year, McCarney accepted the same position at the University of Florida. He coached the defensive line at Florida for two years. During his tenure, the Gators produced NFL draft picks Carlos Dunlap and Jermaine Cunningham.

North Texas
In November 2010, McCarney was offered and accepted the position of head coach at the University of North Texas.

At North Texas, McCarney inherited a team that had endured six consecutive losing seasons, and had not won more than three games in any of those seasons. He won five games his first season, and four the next season; then, in 2013, led the Mean Green to their first winning season since 2004.

In 2013, McCarney led the Mean Green to its third bowl win, posting a 36–14 win over UNLV in the Heart of Dallas Bowl.

McCarney was unable to duplicate his 2013 success in 2014, as the North Texas football team posted a 4-8 record. In October 2015, following a loss to Portland State University, McCarney was fired. The loss had dropped the Mean Green to an 0-5 record to open the 2015 season.

Despite having an overall losing record at North Texas, McCarney managed some highlights in addition to the school's third of three all-time bowl wins. In 2011, he led the Mean Green to its first win over a Big Ten Conference opponent with a 24–21 victory against Indiana. The win was also the school's first at their new stadium, Apogee Stadium, which had opened that year.

The 2011 team set a record for home attendance, drawing 113,186 fans to six games.

His 2013 bowl winning team's nine wins were the most since 2004. To that point, it was only the fifth nine-win season in North Texas football history. The other nine win seasons occurred in 2004, 1978, 1977, and 1959. As North Texas State University, the Eagles had their only 10 win season in 1947.

In 2014, McCarney led North Texas to the most lopsided win in the school's history versus Dallas–Fort Worth metroplex rival SMU, 43–6. To that point, the win was only the fifth by North Texas versus SMU against 28 losses and a tie.

On October 10, 2015, McCarney was fired following a 66–7 loss to Portland State of the NCAA Division I Football Championship Subdivision (FCS). The 59-point margin is the biggest win by an FCS over an NCAA Division I Football Bowl Subdivision (FBS) team since NCAA Division I football was divided into subdivisions in 1978.

Head coaching record

Notes

References

1953 births
Living people
American football offensive linemen
Florida Gators football coaches
Iowa Hawkeyes football coaches
Iowa Hawkeyes football players
Iowa State Cyclones football coaches
North Texas Mean Green football coaches
South Florida Bulls football coaches
Wisconsin Badgers football coaches
Sportspeople from Iowa City, Iowa
Coaches of American football from Iowa
Players of American football from Iowa